Terra Botanica is an amusement and botanical park in Angers.

See also 

 Jardin botanique de la Faculté de Pharmacie d'Angers
 Jardin des Plantes d'Angers
 List of botanical gardens in France

External links
 Terra Botanica - official site

2010 establishments in France
Buildings and structures in Angers
Amusement parks in France
Gardens in Maine-et-Loire
Botanical gardens in France
Tourist attractions in Pays de la Loire
Tourist attractions in Maine-et-Loire
Amusement parks opened in 2010
21st-century architecture in France